Rockin' the Boat is an album by the American jazz organist Jimmy Smith, recorded in 1963 and released on the Blue Note label.

Reception

The AllMusic review by Scott Yanow stated:

Track listing
 "When My Dreamboat Comes Home" (Cliff Friend, Dave Franklin) – 7:29
 "Pork Chop" (Lou Donaldson) – 7:39
 "Matilda, Matilda!" (Harry Thomas) – 2:59
 "Can Heat" (Jimmy Smith) – 5:24
 "Please Send Me Someone to Love" (Percy Mayfield) – 6:14
 "Just a Closer Walk With Thee" (Traditional) – 3:48
 "Trust in Me" (Milton Ager, Jean Schwartz, Ned Wever) – 4:56
Recorded at Van Gelder Studio in Englewood Cliffs, New Jersey on February 7, 1963

Personnel

Musicians
Jimmy Smith – organ
Lou Donaldson – alto saxophone
Quentin Warren – guitar
Donald Bailey – drums
"Big" John Patton – tambourine (tracks 2, 3 & 6)

Technical
 Alfred Lion – producer
 Rudy Van Gelder – engineer
 Reid Miles – design
 Francis Wolff – photography
 Leonard Feather – liner notes

Chart performance

Album

References

Blue Note Records albums
Jimmy Smith (musician) albums
1963 albums
Albums recorded at Van Gelder Studio
Albums produced by Alfred Lion